Morato or Morató is a surname. It is most prevalent in Brazil, followed by Spain and the Philippines.

Notable people with this surname include:
 Andrew Eric Feitosa (born 1992), Brazilian footballer commonly known as Morato
 António Henriques Morato (born 1937), Portuguese footballer
 António Morato (footballer, born 1964), Portuguese footballer
 Joaquín García Morato (1904–1939), Spanish aviator
 Manuel Morato (1933–2021), Filipino politician
 Morato (footballer, born 2001), Brazilian footballer
 Nina Morato (born 1966), French singer-songwriter
 Rosa Morató (born 1979), Spanish runner
 Teresa Morató (born 1998), Andorran footballer
 Tomas Morato (1887-1965), Filipino businessman

References